UV tattoos or blacklight tattoos are tattoos made with dyes that fluoresce visibly under a blacklight or other ultraviolet light source, similar to fluorescein or rhodamine. Depending upon the ink used a UV tattoo can be nearly invisible when illuminated only by light within the visible spectrum. Therefore, they have found popularity with people seeking a subtler tattoo. UV tattoos are particularly popular in the raver community for their distinctive appearance. 

Although UV tattoos are sometimes considered invisible in normal light, scarring produced by the tattoo machine in the application process will remain, and therefore still show. Smaller tattoos will be easier to recognize as tattoos, while larger tattoos are more likely to be recognized as a scar at first glance. A UV tattoo becomes visible under blacklight, when it fluoresces in colors ranging from white to purple, depending upon the ink chosen.

Colored inks are also available, where the ink is visible in normal light (as with a regular tattoo) and the ink will glow vividly under UV light. Due to the mixing of visible and UV pigments the resulting color is not as vibrant in either lighting situation as a dedicated ink.

Damage to the compounds in tattoo ink cause the color of the resulting tattoo to change over time. For UV tattoos this may mean the tattoo becomes more visible under visible light or may not glow in black lighting. Blue UV inks are known to yellow or turn slightly brown with sun exposure.

Safety concerns 
No tattoo inks have ever been approved by the United States Food and Drug Administration because the FDA "has not traditionally regulated tattoo inks or the pigments used in them". Claims made that UV tattoo ink is "FDA Approved" when used for tattooing humans appear to be fraudulent. This is confused by the fact some UV tattoo inks have been approved by the FDA for food-related purposes such as marking food animals like fish and pigs.

Other territories produce standards for tattooing inks but do not keep publicly available lists of products which pass certifications. This makes it very difficult for tattooists and their clients to judge the safety of any particular ink, a problem that extends to all inks.

Some people have reactions to ingredients in tattoo ink, especially to phosphor based tattoo ink ranging from minor itching to dermatitis. Although many people who have received UV tattoos have had physical effects on the skin, any ink could potentially cause a reaction. Any tattoo can produce irritation as a result of not protecting the tattoo from intense sunlight within 3 months of receiving the tattoo or by using irritants such as scented cremes or lotions on the tattoo area.

Application challenges 
UV inks do not blend during application, as normal inks do. Additionally their consistency is thinner. Only experienced tattooists should apply UV tattoos, and should have a blacklight available to help check their work especially if tattooing with an ink intended to be invisible under normal lighting conditions. Due to these complications UV inking takes longer than when using conventional inks.

UV tattoo ink's fluorescence will be dulled if regular ink is used on top of it. Therefore, for vibrant high impact tattoos normal ink is used, allowed to heal, and then highlighted with UV inks.

Photochromatic tattoos 
Photochromatic tattoos that react to UV light to change the colour of the pigment itself instead of simply exhibiting fluorescence have been patented.

See also
Phosphorescent tattoo

References 

Tattooing
Tattoos by type